Gillespie may refer to:

 Gillespie (surname), including a list of people who share the name

Places

United Kingdom
 Gillespie Road, a road in Highbury, London, England
 Gillespie Road, the former name of Arsenal tube station, Highbury, London, England
 Gillespie Park, London Borough of Islington
 James Gillespie's High School, Edinburgh, Scotland

United States
 Gillespie, Arizona
 Gillespie, Illinois
 Gillespie, New Jersey
 Gillespie County, Texas
 Gillespie Field, a county-owned public-use airport near San Diego, California

Other places
 Gillespie Lake, a dried lake on planet Mars near Yellowknife Bay

Other uses
 Gillespie algorithm, for solving stochastic equations
 Gillespie, Kidd & Coia, a Scottish architectural firm
 Gillespie syndrome, a rare genetic disorder
 Gillespie, a novel by the Scottish writer John MacDougall Hay

See also